The Ice Hockey Federation of Kuwait is the governing body of ice hockey in Kuwait. Kuwait had first joined the International Ice Hockey Federation in 1985, but was expelled on May 6, 1992 due to a lack of ice hockey activity. Kuwait was re-admitted into the IIHF on May 8, 2009.

References

External links
Kuwait at IIHF.com

International Ice Hockey Federation members
Ice hockey governing bodies in Asia
Ice Hockey
Ice hockey in Kuwait
Sports organizations established in 2009
2009 establishments in Kuwait